Bank Syariah Indonesia (abbreviated as BSI) is a state-owned Islamic bank in Indonesia. The bank was officially founded on 1 February 2021 as a result of merger between state-owned sharia banks.

Bank Syariah Indonesia has obtain merger permit from Financial Services Authority (OJK) dated 27 January 2021, using BRI Syariah as a surviving company.

History 

BSI originated from three state-owned banks which are subsidiary of larger banks: BRIsyariah (of Bank Rakyat Indonesia/BRI), Bank Syariah Mandiri (of Bank Mandiri) and BNI Syariah (of Bank Negara Indonesia/BNI).
 Bank Syariah Mandiri: The bank was founded in 1955 as Bank Industri Nasional ("National Industrial Bank"); in 1967 it was changed into Bank Maritim Indonesia ("Maritime Bank of Indonesia") and was changed again in 1973 into Bank Susila Bakti. In 1999, the newly founded Bank Mandiri became majority shareholder of the bank, and was converted to sharia banking in 1999 as Bank Syariah Mandiri.
 BNI Syariah: The bank was founded on 29 April 2000 as a sharia banking unit of BNI. In 2010 it spun-off as a separate subsidiary.
 BRIsyariah: The bank was originally established on 3 July 1969 as Bank Djasa Arta (later spelled Bank Jasa Arta) and headquartered in Bandung, West Java. On 19 December 2007, the bank was acquired by BRI. Following Bank Indonesia permit on 16 October 2008, it was converted to sharia banking and officially operated as BRI Syariah on 17 November 2008; in 2009 the sharia banking unit of BRI was officially merged to the bank. In 2018, the bank went public in Indonesian Stock Exchange.

Acquisition of another state-owned bank BTN Syariah is currently being discussed. BTN Syariah was founded on 14 February 2005 as a sharia banking unit of Bank Tabungan Negara (BTN).

References

External links
 Official website

Indonesian companies established in 2008 
2021 establishments in Indonesia 
2018 initial public offerings 
Banks established in 2008 
Banks established in 2021 
Bank Mandiri
Bank Negara Indonesia
Bank Rakyat Indonesia
Islamic banks of Indonesia
Government-owned banks of Indonesia
Companies listed on the Indonesia Stock Exchange
Companies based in Jakarta
Indonesian brands